James Clark Brown (December 1830 – 6 February 1891) was a 19th-century Member of Parliament in Otago, New Zealand.

He was a resident of Lawrence.  
 

He represented Tuapeka on the Otago Provincial Council from 1865 to 1876. His obituary says that he was born in Macclesfield, Cheshire, England and died in St Clair, Dunedin.

References

1830 births
1891 deaths
Members of the New Zealand House of Representatives
Unsuccessful candidates in the 1890 New Zealand general election
New Zealand MPs for South Island electorates
19th-century New Zealand politicians
Members of the Otago Provincial Council
People from Macclesfield
19th-century New Zealand businesspeople
English emigrants to New Zealand